The Lady of Monza (also known as The Awful Story of the Nun of Monza and The Nun of Monza) is a 1969 Italian historical drama film directed by Eriprando Visconti. It is loosely based on the real life events of Marianna de Leyva, better known as "The Nun of Monza", whose story was made famous by Alessandro Manzoni's novel The Betrothed.

Cast 

Anne Heywood:  Virginia de Leyva 
Hardy Krüger: Father Paolo Arrigone 
Antonio Sabàto: Giampaolo
Tino Carraro: Monsignor Barca
Luigi Pistilli: Count de Fuentes
Carla Gravina: Caterina da Meda 
Margarita Lozano: Sister Benedetta Homati
Caterina Boratto: Sister Francesca Imbersaga 
Giovanna Galletti: Sister Angela Sacchi
Anna Maria Alegiani: Sister Ottavia Ricci 
Laura Belli: Sister Candida Colomba 
Renzo Giovampietro: Vicar Saraceno 
Pier Paolo Capponi: Count Taverna 
Maria Michi: Sister Bianca Homati

References

External links

Nunsploitation films
Films directed by Eriprando Visconti
Films scored by Ennio Morricone
Films about clerical celibacy
Italian historical drama films
1960s historical drama films
Cultural depictions of Italian women
1969 drama films
1969 films
1960s Italian-language films
1960s Italian films